Korona Radio 2 or Radio Korona 2 is a Bosnian local commercial radio station, broadcasting from Trebinje, Bosnia and Herzegovina. This radio station was launched in 2018 as the second program of Korona Radio 1 radio station.

The owner of the radio station is the company Korona d.o.o. Trebinje.

Korona Radio 2 broadcasts folk and popular regional music. Program is mainly produced in Serbian language at two FM frequencies and it is available in the city of Trebinje and Gacko as well as in nearby municipalities of East Herzegovina and in neighboring Montenegro and Croatia.

According to a media report from February 2020, Korona Radio 1 and Korona Radio 2 do not have a news program or any other radio program produced in their own studio, for which there are audio recordings in several time intervals during 2019 by examiners in charge of monitoring radio stations. The all-day program of this radio consists of music content and a small number of advertising jingles and advertisements, which deviates greatly from the practice of quality and listened radio stations.

Estimated number of listeners of Korona Radio 2 is around 47.603.

Frequencies
 Trebinje 
 Gacko

See also 
 List of radio stations in Bosnia and Herzegovina
 Korona Radio 1
 Radio Trebinje
 Radio Nevesinje
 Radio Bileća
 Radio gradska mreža - Mostarski radio
 Radio Padrino

References

External links 
 www.koronaonline.com
 www.radiostanica.ba
 www.fmscan.org
 Communications Regulatory Agency of Bosnia and Herzegovina

Trebinje
Radio stations established in 2018
Trebinje